Nevelfjell is a mountain in Lillehammer Municipality in Innlandet county, Norway.

Nevelfjell is a popular destination in the Lillehammer area both in winter and in summer. On clear day there is a good panoramic view of a wide area, including peaks in the Jotunheimen and Rondane mountain ranges. There are hiking and ski trails to the top of Nevelfjell and a small hiking cabin named "Nevelhytta".

See also
List of mountains of Norway by height

References

Lillehammer
Mountains of Innlandet